Best Fiction is the third greatest hits album by Japanese recording artist Namie Amuro, and the final greatest hits release from Avex Trax, her record company since 1995. The release follows her two previous greatest hits albums, 181920 (1998) and Love Enhanced Single Collection (2002). The compilation was released as a stand-alone CD and a deluxe CD/DVD package including music videos. The album includes two new tracks; "Sexy Girl" and "Do Me More", and spawned an extended play 60s 70s 80s.

Best Fiction was commended by contemporary critics who noted the progression of Amuro's image from earlier years, while some were critical towards some songs for their lack of power. The album debuted at number one on a Japanese Oricon Albums Chart, her eighth number one on that chart and lasted six weeks at the top. Best Fiction was certified million by the Recording Industry Association of Japan (RIAJ) for shipments of one million units, her first million certification since 181920. To promote Best Fiction, Amuro went on her Namie Amuro Best Fiction tour 2008–2009 concert tour in October 2008.

Background
In early 2008, Amuro confirmed that she would release a new single for a new greatest hits album. Amuro released the extended play 60s 70s 80s (March 2008) which contained the tracks "New Look", "Rock Steady", and "What a Feeling". She revealed that all her future singles would be promoted through her endorsement deals, with the first single being promoted through hair company Vidal Sassoon. Amuro revealed that two new songs would be featured on the album, these being "Sexy Girl" and "Do Me More". "Sexy Girl" was the theme song for NHK drama Otome no Punch that aired on June 19, and the other called "Do Me More" was the campaign song for Vidal Sassoon.

Best Fiction is Amuro's third greatest hits album, featuring all her tracks from "Wishing on the Same Star" (2002) up until 60s 70s 80s. The album was released in two formats; a stand-alone CD that features a close up of Amuro's face, and a CD and DVD package that has Amuro leaning on top of a car hood. The album artworks were revealed on Oricons blog website, both heavily airbrushed. The title of the compilation was revealed on the website for NHK series "Otome no Punch" on its FAQ. Amuro commented that the image was chosen because it reflected the album's title.

Singles
60s 70s 80s was served as the first single and was formatted as an extended play. The EP contained three songs: "New Look", "Rock Steady", and "What a Feeling". The single debuted at the number-two position on the oricon weekly charts with over 114,000 copies sold. In the second week the single gained the number-one spot for that week, making it her first number-one single after 9 years and 3 months since "I Have Never Seen". According to Oricon, "60s 70s 80s" sold nearly 300,000 copies. 60s 70s 80s was certified platinum by the Recording Industry Association of Japan (RIAJ) for shipments of 250,000 units, her highest selling EP and her highest selling single since her single "Something 'bout the Kiss" (1999).

Reception

Best Fiction received favorable reviews from music critics. Adam Greenberg from Allmusic selected the album as one of Amuro's best works alongside her studio albums Play (2007) and Break the Rules (2002). Reviewing the album, he stated "Rather than taking on the basic manufactured pop sound common to the J-pop world, Amuro spends more of her energy in a dance format, using pounding beats and sexualized lyrics to create a different sound from the light and innocent pop saturating the market, acting as something of a Japanese Madonna in a sense. With Best Fiction, her third greatest-hits compilation, her output from 2002 to 2008 is covered in full detail." He commented that, while "There's some standard fare along the way as well -- items that are sure to hit the charts but leave less lasting impressions", he concluded "There's a lot of range covered here, and all of it performed quite well. Not bad stamina for a onetime idol singer."

Best Fiction sold 681,000 copies in the first week and debuted at the number-one position on the Japanese Oricon Albums Chart. Within its third week, Best Fiction outsold a million copies, and Amuro became the only artist who produced million-selling albums in the oricon chart for three decades of her teens, 20s, and 30s. Best Fiction eventually spent six consecutive weeks at the number-one position, becoming the first album to do so in more than 14 years since the Dreams Come True's 1993 album Magic. Best Fiction became the second best-selling album behind Exile's Exile Love on the Oricon 2008 yearly album charts. In addition, it became the second best selling digital-format album by Japanese artists behind Hikaru Utada's Heart Station on the iTunes yearly album charts in Japan. Best Fiction won the award for "the best album of the year" at the 50th Japan Record Awards.

Promotion
NHK invited her perform at the 59th NHK Kōhaku Uta Gassen, but Amuro declined. On October 25, 2008, Amuro also started a tour called Namie Amuro Best Fiction tour 2008–2009 at the Makuhari Messe. The tour broke attendance records for Japanese solo female artists, playing to 500,000 fans across Japan, China and Taiwan. In an appearance with Sweet magazine, Amuro confirmed the home video release of the tour would instead be of her overseas concerts at the Taipei Arena in Taiwan in June. Her management site formally announced on July 21 the release of "Namie Amuro Best Fiction Tour 2008-2009" on DVD and Blu-ray on September 9, 2009.

Track listing

CD

DVD: Music Videos

Credits 
 Producers: Dallas Austin, Giant Swing, Nao'ymt, Tiny Voice

Charts

Weekly charts

Year-end charts

Certifications

References 

Namie Amuro compilation albums
2008 compilation albums
2008 video albums
Music video compilation albums
Avex Group video albums
Avex Group compilation albums